Steven Tan Teng Chuan (born 28 December 1970) is a Singaporean former footballer who played for the Singapore national team during the 1990s as a striker.

He was best known for coming off the bench as a substitute and scoring the all-important goals during the Malaysia Cup season, earning himself the nickname of the "Super Steve" or "Super sub". He was part of the squad which won the Malaysia Cup in the 1994 FAM League season.

Coaching career 
On 6 January 2011, Tan was appointed as the head coach of Tampines Rovers FC for the 2011 S-League season replacing Vorawan Chitavanich who moved up to become the club technical director. Tampines Rovers won the league in 2011. Tan held this role until August 2012, where he was replaced by Tay Peng Kee after a series of poor results.

Tan is the head coach of Temasek Polytechnic's and Anglo-Chinese School's football team. He is also the technical director of the F-17 Football Academy.

In 2016, Tan became the head coach of the ActiveSG Football Academy’s programme at Kallang Cricket Field.

Personal life 
Tan has three daughters and a son, Marc Tan, who is also a footballer.

References

External links

1970 births
Living people
Singaporean footballers
Singapore international footballers
Singapore FA players
Singaporean sportspeople of Chinese descent
Singaporean football managers
Tampines Rovers FC head coaches
Singapore Premier League head coaches
Association football forwards
Singapore Premier League players
Southeast Asian Games bronze medalists for Singapore
Southeast Asian Games medalists in football
Competitors at the 1993 Southeast Asian Games